Year 397 (CCCXCVII) was a common year starting on Thursday (link will display the full calendar) of the Julian calendar. In the Roman Empire, it was known as the Year of the Consulship of Caesarius and Atticus (or, less frequently, year 1150 Ab urbe condita). The denomination 397 for this year has been used since the early medieval period, when the Anno Domini calendar era became the prevalent method in Europe for naming years.

Events 
 By place 

 Roman Empire 
 Stilicho traps the Visigoths under King Alaric in the Peloponnese, but decides to abandon the campaign against the Visigoths in Greece, thus allowing King Alaric to escape north to Epirus with his loot. Presumably, Stilicho has left Greece in order to prepare for military action in northern Africa, where a rebellion (see Gildonic Revolt in 398) seems imminent.
Emperor Honorius passes a law making barbarian styles of dress illegal in the city of Rome. As a result of this law, everybody in Rome is forbidden from wearing boots, trousers, animal skins, and long hair. This law is passed in response to the increasing popularity of barbarian fashions among the people of Rome.

 China 
 The Xiongnu occupy the Gansu area, an economically important province situated along the Silk Road.

 By topic 

 Religion 
 April 4 – Ambrose, Archbishop of Milan, dies in his diocese after 23 years in office, during which he dominated the political life of the Roman Empire.
 August 28 – Council of Carthage: The biblical canon is definitely declared.
 September 7 – First Council of Toledo: Hispanic bishops, including Lampius, condemn Priscillianism.
 November 13 – John Chrysostom is appointed Archbishop of Constantinople.
 Mor Gabriel Monastery is founded and located on the Tur Abdin plateau near Midyat (Turkey).
 Sulpicius Severus writes the earliest biography of Martin of Tours, the first known "life of a saint" ever written.
 Augustine of Hippo begins his Confessions, an autobiography that recounts his intellectual and spiritual development.
 Scottish missionary Ninian establishes a church (Candida Casa) at Whithorn, and begins his work among the Picts.

Births 
 March 30 or March 31 – K'uk B'alam I, king of Palenque (Mexico)

Deaths 
 April 4 – Aurelius Ambrosius, bishop of Milan
 November 8 – Martin of Tours, bishop and saint
 Murong Hui, imperial prince of Later Yan (b. 373)
 Murong Long, general and prince of Later Yan
 Empress She, wife of emperor Yao Chang

References